Wutai County is a county under the administration of the prefecture-level city of Xinzhou, in the northeast of Shanxi Province, China, bordering Hebei province to the east. It is named after Mount Wutai, which is located within its borders. It was the birthplace of Chinese Warlord and General Yan Xishan. The county spans an area of 2,865 square kilometers, and has a permanent population of 307,200 as of 2018.

Geography 
Wutai County is located in northeastern Shanxi Province under the administration of Xinzhou. The county has an average altitude of 1,200 metres, with a low point of 640 meters at the intersection of the Qingshui River and the Hutou River, and a high point of 3,058 metres at Mount Wutai.

Climate

Administrative divisions 
Wutai County is divided into 5 towns, 11 townships, and 1 county resident's office.

Towns 
The county's 5 towns are Taicheng, and Dongye.

Townships 

Wutai County Resident Office 
The county is also home to the Wutai County Resident Office, which functions as a township-level division of the county.

Demographics 
Of the county's 307,200 permanent residents, 126,200 (41.08%) lived in urban areas as of 2018, whereas the remaining 181,000 (58.92%) lived in rural areas.

Wutai County has a per capita disposable income of 12,838 Yuan, with urban residents averaging 26,643 Yuan and rural residents averaging 6,787 Yuan.

Economy 
The county reported a GDP of 4.953 billion Yuan in 2018, of which, 0.536 billion (10.83%) came from the county's primary sector, 1.789 billion (36.11%) came from the county's secondary sector, and 2.628 billion (53.06%) came from the county's tertiary sector. In 2018, Wutai County recorded 676.90 million Yuan in tax revenue and 1.99 billion Yuan in retail sales. Real estate investment and sales totaled 236 million Yuan in 2018, a 36.4% increase from 2017.

Agriculture 
Major agricultural products in the county include corn, wheat, millet, and beans.

Industry 
Major industries in the county include coal mining, magnesium alloys, and power generation.

Education 
As of 2018, the county had 5,253 pre-school students, 14,954 primary school students, 9,076 junior high students, 4,512 standard secondary school students, and 1,998 vocational secondary school students. That year, Wutai County had 21 kindergartens, 28 primary schools, 24 standard junior high schools, 3 standard secondary schools, and 1 vocational secondary school.

Culture 
The county is home to a number of cultural sights, including a number of historic temples.

References

See also
 Foguang Temple
 Zunsheng Temple

 
County-level divisions of Shanxi
Xinzhou